The Central High School of Clay County, or Clay Central, is a public, 5A division school located in Lineville in east central Alabama.  The school was opened in 2012 and is the largest school in the eastern region.

References

External links

Central High School of Clay County at Clay County Board of Education website

2012 establishments in Alabama
Clay County, Alabama
Public high schools in Alabama
Educational institutions established in 2012